The Barefoot Boy is a 1923 American silent drama film directed by David Kirkland and starring John Bowers, Marjorie Daw, and Sylvia Breamer. The film is based upon a poem of the same name by John Greenleaf Whittier.

Cast

Preservation
Partial prints of The Barefoot Boy are maintained by the UCLA Film and Television Archive and George Eastman Museum Motion Picture Collection.

References

Bibliography
 Bernard F. Dick. Columbia Pictures: Portrait of a Studio. University Press of Kentucky, 2015.

External links

1923 films
1923 drama films
1920s English-language films
American silent feature films
Silent American drama films
American black-and-white films
Films directed by David Kirkland
Columbia Pictures films
1920s American films